Mořkov is a municipality and village in Nový Jičín District in the Moravian-Silesian Region of the Czech Republic. It has about 2,500 inhabitants.

Geography
The northern part of the municipality lies in the Moravian-Silesian Foothills, the southern part lies in the Moravian-Silesian Beskids.

History
The first written mention of Mořkov is from 1411.

Transport
Mořkov is located on the railway line from Valašské Meziříčí to Frýdlant nad Ostravicí.

References

External links

Villages in Nový Jičín District